Salaverry is a surname. Notable people with the surname include:

Daniel Salaverry (born 1972), Peruvian architect and politician
Felipe Santiago Salaverry (1805–1836), Peruvian soldier and politician
Ivan Salaverry (born 1971), Canadian mixed martial arts fighter and instructor

See also
Salaberry